The Royal College Dehradun is a co-educational independent boarding school in Dehradun, Uttarakhand, India. The school was founded in 2001 by Sharad Munsen, and has a 25-acre campus near Dak Pathar about 50 km from Dehradun City.

References

Boarding schools in Uttarakhand
Private schools in Uttarakhand
Schools in Dehradun
Educational institutions established in 2001
2001 establishments in Uttarakhand